"Watagatapitusberry" is a collaborative effort by Black Point with American recording artist Pitbull, released on March 9, 2010 as the lead single from his fifth studio album, Armando (2010). The song features guest appearances from Dominican rappers Sensato del Patio, El Cata and Black Point, along with Lil Jon. It combines hip hop and "Latin pop-style theatricality".

Background and composition
After the release of Pitbull's then previous album Rebelution (2009), Pitbull released his first Spanish-language album, titled Armando. The first single from this album was "Watagatapitusberry". This song was produced by DJ Class. The song is a remix, with the original belonging to Dominican hip hop recording artist Sensato del Patio.

Music video
The music video was released onto Pitbull's official VEVO channel on March 10, 2010, and has received over 10 million views as of June 2021.

Credits and personnel
Armando C. Perez – songwriter
Edward Bello Po – songwriter
Lil Jon – songwriter
Daniel Woodis Jr. – songwriter
DJ Class – producer

Source:

Charts

Release history

References

2010 singles
El Cata songs
Lil Jon songs
Pitbull (rapper) songs
Songs written by Lil Jon
Spanish-language songs
Songs written by Pitbull (rapper)
2010 songs
Songs written by El Cata
Sony Music Latin singles